Life's Little Ironies is a collection of tales written by Thomas Hardy,  originally published in 1894, and republished with a slightly different collection of stories, for the Uniform Edition in 1927/8.

1927 edition contents

An Imaginative Woman
The Son's Veto  
For Conscience' Sake  
A Tragedy Of Two Ambitions 
On the Western Circuit
To Please His Wife
The Fiddler of the Reels
A Few Crusted Characters—
Introduction
Tony Kytes, the Arch-Deceiver
The History of the Hardcomes
The Superstitious Man's Story
Andrey Satchel and the Parson and Clerk
Old Andrey's Experience as a Musician
Absent-Mindedness in a Parish Choir
The Winters and the Palmleys
Incident in the Life of Mr. George Crookhill
Netty Sargent's Copyhold

There is a Prefatory Note to the revised edition, written by the author, which says this of the above contents:
“Of the following collection the first story, ‘An Imaginative Woman’, originally stood in Wessex Tales, but was brought into this volume as being more nearly its place, turning as it does upon a trick of Nature, so to speak, a physical possibility that may attach to a wife of vivid imaginings, as is well known to medical practitioners and other observers of such manifestations. The two stories named ‘A Tradition of Eighteen Hundred and Four’ and 'The Melancholy Hussar of the German Legion’, which were formerly printed in this series, were also transferred to Wessex Tales, where they more naturally belong.
The above alterations were first made in the Uniform Edition in 1927. The present narratives and sketches, though separately published at various antecedent dates, were first collected and issued in a volume in 1894. T.H.”

The original collection came out as a pocket edition in 1907 (reprinted nine times); the 1927 revision was reset and issued 1928 (reprinted 1929, 1937, 1953). Six of the stories (excluding "To Please His Wife" and "A Few Crusted Characters") appeared in the Penguin Classic The Fiddler of the Reels and Other Stories.

Film and TV Adaptations

Two of the short stories were adapted as one-off TV dramas by the BBC in the 1973 anthology Wessex Tales:
A Tragedy of Two Ambitions (21 November 1973 / BBC2)
An Imaginative Woman (28 November 1973 / BBC2).

References

External links

 

1894 short story collections
Short story collections by Thomas Hardy